Major General Merdith Wyndham Bolling "Bo" Temple (July 8, 1953 – November 1, 2020) was a senior officer of the United States Army who served as the Acting Chief of Engineers and Acting Commanding General of the United States Army Corps of Engineers (USACE) from 2011 to 2012. He previously served as Deputy Chief of Engineers and Deputy Commanding General.

Early life and career
Merdith Wyndham Bolling Temple was born in Richmond, Virginia, on July 8, 1953. He graduated from the Virginia Military Institute with a bachelor's degree in civil engineering and Texas A&M University with a master's degree in civil engineering. Commissioned into the United States Army in 1975, he served in operational engineering commands in Korea, the U.S., and Germany before commanding the 307th Engineer Battalion. He commanded the 20th Engineer Brigade (Combat) (Airborne) at Fort Bragg, North Carolina, from 1998 to 2000. He died of cancer on November 1, 2020, at home in Richmond, Virginia.

Selected works

References

External links

 

1953 births
2020 deaths
20th-century American non-fiction writers
21st-century American non-fiction writers
American male non-fiction writers
American military engineers
American military writers
Deaths from cancer in Virginia
Military personnel from Richmond, Virginia
Military personnel of the Cold War
Recipients of the Distinguished Service Medal (US Army)
Recipients of the Legion of Merit
Texas A&M University alumni
United States Army Command and General Staff College alumni
United States Army Corps of Engineers Chiefs of Engineers
United States Army generals
United States Army personnel of the Gulf War
United States Army War College alumni
Virginia Military Institute alumni
Writers from Virginia